Sensitizer or sensitiser may refer to:

 Chemical sensitizer, a chemical that causes allergic reaction in normal tissue after exposure
 Explosive sensitizer, a chemical that promotes the rate of propagation of an explosive; see Chemical explosive#Sensitizer
 Photosensitizer, a chemical that is involved in photoelectrochemical processes

See also
 Sensitization (disambiguation)
 Sensitivity (disambiguation)